Boucheticonus is a subgenus  of sea snails, cone snails, marine gastropod mollusks in the genus Conasprella,  family Conidae, the cone snails and their allies.

In the new classification of the family Conidae by Puillandre N., Duda T.F., Meyer C., Olivera B.M. & Bouchet P. (2015), Boucheticonus has become a subgenus of Conasprella: Conasprella (Boucheticonus) Tucker & Tenorio, 2013   represented as Conasprella Thiele, 1929

Species list
This list of species is based on the information in the WoRMS list. Species within the genus Boucheticonus include:
 Boucheticonus alisi (Moolenbeek, Röckel & Richard, 1995): synonym of Conasprella alisi (Moolenbeek, Röckel & Richard, 1995)
 Boucheticonus dayriti (Röckel & da Motta, 1983): synonym of Conus dayriti Röckel & da Motta, 1983
 Boucheticonus grohi (Tenorio & Poppe, 2004): synonym of Conasprella grohi (Tenorio & Poppe, 2004)
 Boucheticonus spirofilis (Habe & Kosuge, 1970): synonymù of Conasprella spirofilis (Habe & Kosuge, 1970)

References

 Tucker J.K. & Tenorio M.J. (2013) Illustrated catalog of the living cone shells. 517 pp. Wellington, Florida: MdM Publishing. page(s): 22-23

External links
 Puillandre N., Duda T.F., Meyer C., Olivera B.M. & Bouchet P. (2015). One, four or 100 genera? A new classification of the cone snails. Journal of Molluscan Studies. 81: 1-23

Conidae
Gastropod subgenera